Robert Anthony Thomson (5 December 1943 – 19 August 2009) was an English professional footballer. He made 478 appearances in the English Football League and won eight caps for England.

Something of a legend at his first club – Wolverhampton Wanderers, he is considered to be one of the finest full-backs ever to have played for the team. Departing Wolves in 1969, he then moved on to Birmingham City and then Luton Town. He was promoted out of the Second Division with all three clubs. His later career involved moving between numerous clubs, both at home and abroad. He spent time as player-coach at Connecticut Bicentennials and player-manager of Stafford Rangers.

Early and personal life
Robert Anthony Thomson was born on 5 December 1943 in Smethwick, Worcestershire. He married to Janice Llewellyn in 1966 and had three children. After retiring from playing, he ran a sports shop in Sedgley in the West Midlands. He was known to take part in Wolves All Stars charity games from his retirement up until his last years, as well as help coach youngsters in Oldbury. He died of prostate cancer at Russells Hall Hospital in Dudley at the age of 65. He had apparently recovered from a first occurrence of the illness, only to succumb after suffering a relapse.

Club career
Thomson was born in Smethwick, which was then in Staffordshire. He joined local side Wolverhampton Wanderers in 1959 upon leaving Lyndon High School in Solihull. He signed professional forms in July 1961, before making his senior debut on 27 January 1962 in an FA Cup tie against Black Country rivals West Bromwich Albion. Between his debut in 1962 to 1967 he missed just 11 first team games.

Unfortunately for Thomson, he was too late for the glory years, and instead came through under the tail-end of manager Stan Cullis' sixteen-year reign. Their best finish during Thomson's time was fifth in the First Division in 1962–63. The club fell to the Second Division in 1964–65. They won promotion at the second time of asking – in 1966–67, as runners-up. In Summer 1967 he was part of the Wolves side that played in the United States, guesting as the Los Angeles Wolves, under which guise they won the United Soccer Association league championship.

In March 1969, Thomson moved on to Birmingham City for £40,000, teaming up with his former boss Stan Cullis, though Cullis retired early the next year. He played 44 games of the 1969–70 campaign, in a settled back four made up of Thomson, Dave Robinson, Garry Pendrey, and Ray Martin. However, he fell out of favour under new boss Freddie Goodwin, and featured just 15 times in 1970–71. In 1971–72, Birmingham gained promotion to the top tier, as runners-up behind Norwich City. He did not play any first team games however, and instead spent part of 1971 on loan at nearby Third Division club Walsall.

In 1972, he moved on to Luton Town, another Second Division side with ambitions of top-flight football. Thomson's teams had a knack of finishing second in the second tier, as the "Hatters" achieved this in 1973–74, as they watched Middlesbrough sprint away with the title. Luton were unfortunate to go back down in 1974–75, finishing a mere point from the safety of Tottenham Hotspur in 19th.

In 1976, his career drawing to a close and his best days behind him, Thomson went back to the States, spending a short period with Hartford Bicentennials. He returned to the English Football League, and the West Midlands, with Third Division Port Vale in October 1976. He made an 'impressive' debut in a 3–2 defeat to Wrexham at Vale Park on 16 October 1976 and earned himself both a regular first team spot and the captaincy. He played 24 games for Roy Sproson's team in 1976–77, before he returned to the re-branded Connecticut Bicentennials as player-coach in March 1977.

He stayed with the Connecticut Bicentennials for two years, before returning to England with non-league Worcester City. He later became player-manager of Stafford Rangers. Another spell in the US with Memphis Rogues in the NASL followed, before he joined Brewood, Solihull Borough and then Tipton Town.

International career
Thomson won eight full caps with the senior team between 1963 and 1964. He was selected by Alf Ramsey and made his full international debut on 20 November 1963 in an 8–3 Home International victory over Northern Ireland. His final international appearance came in December 1964.

He also played fifteen games for the England under-23 team, which was a record.

Style of play
Thomson was an exceptionally fast full-back and was also extremely adept at back-pedalling.

Career statistics

Club

International

Honours
Wolverhampton Wanderers
Football League Second Division second-place promotion: 1966–67

Luton Town
Football League Second Division second-place promotion: 1973–74

England
British Home Championship: 1963–64 (shared), 1964–65

References

Sportspeople from Smethwick
English footballers
England international footballers
England under-23 international footballers
Association football fullbacks
English Football League players
Wolverhampton Wanderers F.C. players
Birmingham City F.C. players
Walsall F.C. players
Luton Town F.C. players
Port Vale F.C. players
Worcester City F.C. players
Willenhall Town F.C. players
Solihull Borough F.C. players
United Soccer Association players
Los Angeles Wolves players
North American Soccer League (1968–1984) players
Connecticut Bicentennials players
Memphis Rogues players
Stafford Rangers F.C. players
Tipton Town F.C. players
English Football League representative players
English expatriate sportspeople in the United States
Expatriate soccer players in the United States
English expatriate footballers
Association football coaches
Association football player-managers
English football managers
Stafford Rangers F.C. managers
Deaths from prostate cancer
Deaths from cancer in England
1943 births
2009 deaths